The United Kingdom (UK) was a member of the European Economic Area (EEA) from 1 January 1994 to 31 December 2020, following the coming into force of the 1992 EEA Agreement (as adjusted by a 1993 protocol). Membership of the EEA is a consequence of membership of the European Union (EU). The UK ceased to be a Contracting Party to the EEA Agreement after its withdrawal from the EU on 31 January 2020, as it was a member of the EEA by virtue of its EU membership, but retained EEA rights during the Brexit transition period, based on Article 126 of the withdrawal agreement between the EU and the UK.  During the transition period, which ended on 31 December 2020, the UK and EU negotiated their future relationship.

The EFTA members of the EEA and the UK signed a Separation Agreement on 28 January 2020. The Separation Agreement mirrors the relevant parts of the EU–UK Withdrawal Agreement.

Following the completion of its withdrawal from the EU, the UK could have sought to continue to be a member of the EEA through mechanisms available to members of the European Free Trade Association (EFTA). Theresa May, then Prime Minister of the United Kingdom, stated in 2017 that the British government would not seek permanent membership of the European Single Market.

Current status
The United Kingdom was a member of the European Economic Area as a member of the European Union. Questions have been raised as to whether a state that withdraws from the EU automatically withdraws from the EEA, or whether such a withdrawal requires notice under Article 127 of the EEA Agreement – and, if the courts so decide, whether such notice given by the UK would require an Act of Parliament.

The EEA still applied to the UK during the Brexit transition period, based on Article 126 of the withdrawal agreement between the EU and the UK.

EFTA membership
Were the UK to join the EEA as an EFTA member, it would sign up to existing EU internal market legislation that is part of the EEA Agreement. Changes to the internal market would be incorporated into the EEA Agreement subject to the consent of the UK at the EEA Joint Committee; once in the EEA Agreement, the UK would have to incorporate these into UK law. The EU is also required to conduct extensive consultations with EEA EFTA members beforehand via its many committees and cooperative bodies. Some EU law originates from various international bodies on which non-EU EEA countries have a seat.

The EEA Agreement (EU and EFTA members except Switzerland) does not cover Common Agriculture and Fisheries Policies, the EU Customs Union, the Common Trade Policy, the Common Foreign and Security Policy, direct and indirect taxation, and Police and Judicial Co-operation in Criminal Matters, leaving EFTA members free to set their own policies in these areas; however, EEA countries are required to contribute to the EU Budget in exchange for access to the internal market.

A 2013 research paper presented to the Parliament of the United Kingdom proposed a number of alternatives to EU membership which would continue to allow it access to the EU's internal market, including continuing EEA membership as an EFTA member state, or the Swiss model of a number of bilateral treaties covering the provisions of the single market.

EFTA views
The UK was a co-founder of EFTA in 1960, but ceased to be a member in 1973 upon joining the EC, which became the EU.

In the first meeting since the Brexit vote, EFTA reacted by stating that it was open to the prospect of the UK rejoining the association, but that the UK has many issues to work through. The president of Switzerland Johann Schneider-Ammann stated that the UK's return would strengthen the association.  However, in August 2016 the Norwegian Government expressed reservations. Norway's European affairs minister, Elisabeth Vik Aspaker, told the Aftenposten newspaper: "It's not certain that it would be a good idea to let a big country into this organisation. It would shift the balance, which is not necessarily in Norway's interests".

Scottish membership of EFTA
Given Scotland's vote in the 2016 referendum to remain in the EU, contrasted with that of the UK as a whole, 
the Scottish Government has looked into methods of retaining access to or membership of the EEA.  However, other EFTA states have stated that only sovereign states are eligible for membership, so Scotland could only join if it became independent from the UK.

UK Government view
In January 2017, Theresa May announced a 12-point plan of negotiating objectives and confirmed that the British government would not seek continued permanent membership in the European Single Market, leaving open an option of retaining EEA membership for a-one year transition period after EU exit day (originally 29 March 2019, postponed to 12 April and then to 31 October, before finally occurring on 31 January 2020).

Role of the European Court of Justice
Under the EEA Agreement, the UK would not necessarily be subject to European Court of Justice rulings but possibly also the EFTA Court, which resolves disputes under the EEA Agreement regarding EFTA Member States. The Court also resolves disputes between EEA persons and the EFTA Surveillance Authority.

Separation agreement

The separation agreement is the Agreement on arrangements between Iceland, the Principality of Liechtenstein, the Kingdom of Norway and the United Kingdom of Great Britain and Northern Ireland following the withdrawal of the United Kingdom from the European Union, the EEA Agreement and other agreements applicable between the United Kingdom and the EEA EFTA States by virtue of the United Kingdom’s membership of the European Union.

It defines the relationship between the United Kingdom and the EFTA during the transition period.

See also

European Union (Withdrawal) Act 2018

References

European Economic Area
Brexit